The 1908 Kansas State Aggies football team represented Kansas State Agricultural College (now Kansas State University) in the 1908 college football season. In their fourth year under head coach Mike Ahearn, the Aggies compiled a 6–2 record, and outscored their opponents by a combined total of 182 to 74.

Schedule

References

Kansas State
Kansas State Wildcats football seasons
Kansas State Aggies football